Belarmino Salgado Martínez (born September 27, 1966) is a retired male judoka from Cuba. He competed for his native country at the 1992 Summer Olympics in the Men's Half-Heavyweight (– 95 kg) division, and won a total number of three medals during his career at the Pan American Games (1987, 1991 and 1995).

References

Belarmino Salgado's profile at JudoInside.com

1966 births
Living people
Judoka at the 1992 Summer Olympics
Judoka at the 1991 Pan American Games
Judoka at the 1995 Pan American Games
Cuban male judoka
Pan American Games gold medalists for Cuba
Pan American Games bronze medalists for Cuba
Pan American Games medalists in judo
Medalists at the 1987 Pan American Games
Medalists at the 1991 Pan American Games
Medalists at the 1995 Pan American Games
20th-century Cuban people
21st-century Cuban people